Strung Up is a studio album by The Nashville String Band. The band consisted of Chet Atkins and Homer and Jethro.

Track listing

Side one
 "Last Train to Clarksville" (Boyce and Hart)
 "Nola"
 "Genevieve"
 "Opryland"
 "Happy Ending"

Side two
 "Alhambra"
 "El Cóndor Pasa" (Daniel Alomía Robles)
 "Tennessee Waltz"
 "The Birth of the Blues" (Lew Brown, Buddy G. DeSylva, Ray Henderson)
 "Flaky"

Personnel 
Chet Atkins – guitar
Henry "Homer" Haynes - guitar
Kenneth "Jethro" Burns - mandolin
Johnny Gimble – fiddle

The Nashville String Band albums
1971 albums
RCA Victor albums